The following highways are numbered Route 311:

Canada
 Manitoba Provincial Road 311
 Nova Scotia Route 311
 Prince Edward Island Route 311
 Quebec Route 311

China
 China National Highway 311

Costa Rica
 National Route 311

Japan
 Japan National Route 311

United States
  U.S. Route 311
  Arkansas Highway 311
  Georgia State Route 311
  Hawaii Route 311
  Indiana State Road 311
  Kentucky Route 311
  Louisiana Highway 311
  Maryland Route 311
  M-311 (Michigan highway)
  Mississippi Highway 311
  Montana Secondary Highway 311
 New York:
  New York State Route 311
 County Route 311 (Albany County, New York)
 County Route 311 (Westchester County, New York)
  North Carolina Highway 311 (former)
  Puerto Rico Highway 311
  South Carolina Highway 311
  Tennessee State Route 311
 Texas:
  Texas State Highway 311 (former)
  Texas State Highway Spur 311
  Farm to Market Road 311
  Utah State Route 311
  Virginia State Route 311
  Washington State Route 311 (former)
  West Virginia Route 311
  Wyoming Highway 311

United Arab Emirates
 E 311, also known as Emirates Road